The ten dollar bill may refer to banknotes (bills) of currencies that are named dollar. Note that some of these currencies may have coins for 10 dollars instead.

 Australian 10 dollar note
 Canadian ten-dollar bill
 New Zealand ten-dollar note
 United States ten-dollar bill

Ten dollar bill may also refer to:
Ten Dollar Bill (Roy Lichtenstein drawing)